The 1982 UK Championship (also known as the 1982 Coral UK Championship for sponsorship reasons) was a professional non-ranking snooker tournament that took place at the Guild Hall in Preston, England, between 20 November and 4 December 1982. This was the sixth edition of the UK Championship and the fifth staging of the competition in Preston. The event was sponsored by Coral for the fifth year in a row. The televised stages were shown on the BBC from 27 November through to the end of the championship.

Terry Griffiths won his first and only UK title by winning the last three frames of the final to defeat Alex Higgins 16–15. On his way to victory, Griffiths also beat defending champion Steve Davis, who had defeated him in the previous year's final. The highest break of the tournament was a 137 made by Higgins.

Prize fund
The breakdown of prize money for this year is shown below:

Main draw

Final

Qualifying

Round 1
Best of 17 frames

 Geoff Foulds 9–2 Matt Gibson 

 Graham Cripsey 6–9 Bob Harris 

 Vic Harris 9–6 Marcus Owen 

 Les Dodd 9–1 Ian Williamson 

 Ian Black 3–9 Mick Fisher 

 Clive Everton 4–9 Tommy Murphy 

 Bernard Bennett w/o–w/d John Phillps 

 Colin Roscoe 9–6 Jackie Rea

Round 2
Best of 17 frames

 Rex Williams 9–7 Geoff Foulds 

 Mike Watterson 3–9 Bob Harris 

 Joe Johnson 9–8 Vic Harris 

 Jim Meadowcroft 9–8 Dennis Hughes 

 Doug French 7–9 Les Dodd 

 Tony Meo 9–5 George Scott 

 Jack Fitzmaurice 0–9 Billy Kelly 

 Pat Houlihan w/o–w/d John Dunning

 Dave Martin 9–6 Murdo MacLeod 

 Ray Edmonds 8–9 Mick Fisher 

 Jim Donnelly 9–6 Chris Ross 

 Eddie Sinclair 9–5 Tommy Murphy 

 Paul Medati 9–1 Bernard Bennett 

 Cliff Wilson 9–6 Eddie McLaughlin 

 Mike Hallett 9–1 Bert Demarco 

 Mark Wildman 9–4 Colin Roscoe

Century breaks

 137, 112, 101  Alex Higgins
 135  Dennis Taylor
 132, 118  Steve Davis
 127  John Virgo
 119, 110  Ray Reardon
 115  Mark Wildman
 107  Graham Cripsey
 102, 101  Rex Williams

References

1982
UK Championship
UK Championship
UK Championship
UK Championship